Allan McHardy (28 November 1914 – 25 March 1986) was an Australian rules footballer who played for the Essendon Football Club in the Victorian Football League (VFL).

Notes

External links 
		

1914 births
1986 deaths
Australian rules footballers from Victoria (Australia)
Essendon Football Club players